The Rapaki steam crane was a historic ship in New Zealand.

On 24 December 1925 the Lyttelton Harbour Board ordered an 80-ton self-propelled floating crane, called Rapaki. She was named after the settlement close to Lyttelton of the same name.  She was built at a cost of £42,000. The Rapaki took 109 days to sail from Greenock to Lyttelton, arriving on 28 July 1926. Rapaki was one of two steam cranes in New Zealand waters, the other being the Hikitia which as of 2021 can still be visited on the Wellington Waterfront. Rapaki operated in Lyttelton for 60 years. During World War 2 Rapaki was requisitioned for war work in the Pacific. It had been intended that she go to the Middle East but after Japan joined the war this plan was cancelled.

At the end of her working life Rapaki was transported to Auckland and became an exhibit at the Maritime Museum on Auckland's waterfront. In December 2018, the Rapaki was towed to Wynyard Wharf to be broken up. Some of its parts were given to the Hikitia.

See also
 List of classic vessels
 List of museum ships

References 

The New Zealand Maritime Record
Engineering Heritage New Zealand

Merchant ships of New Zealand
Steam cranes
Ships built on the River Clyde
Paisley, Renfrewshire
Crane vessels
Floating cranes
Individual cranes (machines)
1925 ships